Yuri Bakhshyan (June 28, 1947 in Goris –  October 27, 1999 in Yerevan) was an Armenian politician, the Deputy Speaker of National Assembly of Armenia.

Biography 
Bakhshyan was born in 1947, in Goris. He finished the faculty of Physics of the Yerevan State University, then worked as senior scientist. He became Deputy speaker of the Armenian parliament in 1998 until his assassination with other eight politicians in parliament in the Armenian parliament shooting.

He had three children with his wife, Anahit Bakhshyan.

External links
Biography

1947 births
1999 deaths
People from Goris
Assassinated Armenian politicians
Deaths by firearm in Armenia
People murdered in Armenia
Yerevan State University alumni
Members of the National Assembly (Armenia)
Victims of the Armenian parliament shooting
1990s murders in Armenia
1999 crimes in Armenia
1999 murders in Asia
1999 murders in Europe